Automaboulisme et Autorité (scène comique clownesque), released in the United States as The Clown and Automobile and in the United Kingdom as The Clown and Motor Car, is an 1899 French silent film directed by Georges Méliès. It was released by Méliès's Star Film Company and is numbered 194–195 in its catalogues.

The film was presumed lost until 2011, when a hand-colored fragment on nitrate film was found among a collection donated to the Cinémathèque Française.

Summary
Though the print rediscovered in 2011 only comprises fragments of the original, Méliès's film catalogues provide a summary of the complete film:

Legacy
When writing about his childhood, the filmmaker Jean Renoir described a short silent film he saw as a child in 1902, featuring a clown called "Automaboul." The film made a vivid impression on Renoir, who said in 1938 that he "would give almost anything to see that program again. That was real cinema, much more than the adaptation of a novel by Georges Ohnet or a play by Victorien Sardou can ever be." The film scholar Alexander Sesonske has suggested that the film Renoir remembered was Méliès's Automaboulisme et Autorité.

References

Films directed by Georges Méliès
French comedy short films
French black-and-white films
1899 films
1890s rediscovered films
French silent short films
Comedy films about clowns
Rediscovered French films
1899 short films
Silent comedy films
1890s French films